Oaonui is a community in the west of Taranaki, in the North Island of New Zealand.

The New Zealand Ministry for Culture and Heritage gives a translation of "place of many clouds" for Ōaonui.

Marae

Te Pōtaka Marae and Te Pōtaka meeting house are located in the Oaonui area. The marae is a meeting ground for the Taranaki hapū of Ngāti Haupoto, Ngāti Tara and Ngāti Tuhekerangi.

In October 2020, the Government committed $105,342 from the Provincial Growth Fund to upgrade the marae, creating 8 jobs.

References

South Taranaki District
Populated places in Taranaki